Nicotine is a heavy metal band from Indore, India, formed in December 2006. Its line-up consists of Digvijay Bhonsale on lead vocals/rhythm guitar, Aniruddha Gokhale (Founding member) on lead guitar/backing vocals, Anuj Malkapurkar on bass guitar and Shaleen Vyas on drums. The band is widely known for being the 'Pioneers of Metal music in Central India', as they were one of the first bands to introduce Metal/Heavy Metal music in the region.
Their songs "Odium" and "Rein of Fire" were released for free downloading by the band on various websites.
The band is influenced by American and British rock and metal bands such as Rage Against the Machine, Metallica, Megadeth, Iron Maiden and Pantera.

See also
 Indian rock

References

Musical groups established in the 2000s
Musical groups established in 2006
Musical quartets
Indian heavy metal musical groups